Taftan is a trunk road and railway town in Chagai District, Balochistan, Pakistan. It is one of Pakistan's border crossings with Iran.

At its western extreme, the border crossing point of Iran is Mirjaveh.

Transport
It is on the N40 road. This becomes the road 84 in Iran's system, and which meanders via Kerman to a number change west of Rafsanjan.

It is served by its railway station on the line commonly described as the Quetta-Taftan Line but which, since 1940, continues to Zahedan, Iran.

References

External links 

 Exclusive report on Baluch Wall - 11 June 2007

Iran–Pakistan border crossings
Populated places in Chagai District
Smuggling routes
Tehsils of Balochistan, Pakistan